The Affirmation World Tour is the third and final concert tour by Australian group, Savage Garden. The tour was launched to support their second studio album, Affirmation (1999). The tour played over 80 shows in Asia, Australia, North America, Europe and Africa.

Concerts in Brisbane were recorded and released to video in 2001. Superstars and Cannonballs includes concert footage and the documentary, "Parallel Lives" and music videos.

Opening acts
Vanessa Amorosi 
Kina 
S.O.A.P.

Setlist
The following setlist was obtained from the 8 December 2000 concert, held at the Point Theatre in Dublin, Ireland. It does not represent all concerts for the duration of the tour.

"The Best Thing"
"Break Me Shake Me"
"To the Moon and Back"
"The Lover After Me"
"I Don't Know You Anymore"
"Santa Monica"
"Two Beds and a Coffee Machine"
"You Can Still Be Free"
"The Animal Song"
"Hold Me"
"Gunning Down Romance"
"Crash and Burn"
"Truly Madly Deeply"
"Chained to You"
"I Want You"
"I Knew I Loved You"
"Affirmation"

Tour dates

Festivals and other miscellaneous performances

This concert was a part of the "Uncle Sam Jam"
This concert was a part of the "Troy Fair"
This concert was a part of "Z 4 All"
This concert was a part of the "Ionia Free Fair"
This concert was a part of the "Ohio State Fair"
This concert was a part of the "Wisconsin State Fair"
This concert was a part of "Musikfest"
This concert was a part of the "State Fair of West Virginia"
This concert was a part of the "Illinois State Fair"
This concert was a part of the "Midland County Fair"
This concert was a part of the "Missouri State Fair"
This concert was a part of the "Allen County Fair"
This concert was a part of the "Interlochen Arts Festival"
This concert was a part of the "Colorado State Fair"
This concert was a part of "Bumbershoot"
This concert was a part of the "Last Chance Summer Dance"

Cancellations and rescheduled shows

Personnel
Band
Drums: Karl Lewis
Guitar: Ben Carey and Daniel Jones
Bass guitar: Lee Novak
Keyboards: Jennifer Blakeman and Daniel Jones
Backing vocalists: Angela Bekker, Elisa Fiorillo and Anna Maria La Spina

Crew
Tour manager: Peter McFee
Assistant tour manager: Susie Steadman
Stage manager: Colin Skals
Wardrobe: Nina De Palma
Production design: Willy Williams and Bruce Ramus
Lighting director: Bruce Ramus
Lighting operator: Sean Hackett
FOH Engineer: Colin Ellis
Monitor engineer: Scott Pike
Guitar technician: Adrian Dessent and Lindsay McKay
Drum technician: Simon Moran

External links
Savage Garden Official Website

References

2000 concert tours